The Tondiraba Ice Hall, is a multi-purpose indoor arena complex in Tallinn, Estonia. It was opened on 1 August 2014 and is owned by the City of Tallinn. It has a current capacity of 7,700 spectators. It can host among other things basketball games, ice hockey games, curling and concerts.

History
Tondiraba Ice Rink was opened in August 2014 as the first large building of the Tondiraba Sports Complex. It has a main arena, two practice rinks and a curling rink. The main arena can be used for sports including figure skating, ice hockey, short track speed skating, volleyball, handball, gymnastics and also concerts.

The ISU World Junior Figure Skating Championships 2015, held from 2 March to 8 March that year, claimed to be the first championship held in the complex. However, the 2015 World Junior Curling Championships logically deserves this title as despite concluding on the same date, it began several days earlier on 28 February.

One Finnish Liiga hockey match has been played in the Tondiraba Ice Hall between HPK and Pelicans, on 27 January 2018. HPK won the game 3–4 after the shootout.

Tondiraba hosted the 2018 European Curling Championships from 16–24 November and 2022 European Figure Skating Championships from 10-16 January.

See also
List of indoor arenas in Estonia

References

External links

 

Sports venues completed in 2014
2014 establishments in Estonia
Sports venues in Estonia
Basketball venues in Estonia
Indoor arenas in Estonia
Indoor ice hockey venues in Estonia
Sports venues in Tallinn
Curling venues